Allan Taylor may refer to:

Allan R. Taylor (born 1932), Canadian banker
Allan Taylor (diplomat) (1941–2007), Australian diplomat and Director-General of ASIS
Allan Taylor (footballer) (1905–1981), English professional footballer
Allan Taylor (British Army officer) (1919–2004), British general
Allan Kerr Taylor (1832–1890), New Zealand landowner and businessman
Allan Taylor (snooker player) (born 1984), English snooker player
Allan Taylor (musician) (born 1945), singer-songwriter

See also
Alan Taylor (disambiguation)